Lettuce big-vein disease causes leaf distortion and ruffling in affected lettuce plants.

This disease was first associated in 1983 with a rod-shaped virus named lettuce big-vein associated virus (LBVaV), which is transmitted by the obligately parasitic soil-inhabiting fungus, Olpidium brassicae. However, in 2000, a second virus, Mirafiori lettuce virus, was found in lettuce showing big-vein symptoms. Furthermore, since the lettuce infected with this virus alone developed big-vein symptoms, it is considered to be a main agent of the big-vein disease.

Symptoms 
Affected plants have veins that become large and clear, causing the rest of the leaf to become ruffled. Severely infected plants may fail to form a lettuce head.

Control 
 Grow disease-resistant cultivars.
 Use disease-free healthy seeds.
 Treat with methyl bromide, chloropicrin, or dazomet solution.

References 

Lettuce diseases
Viral plant pathogens and diseases
Leaf diseases
Rhabdoviridae